The Lac du Val-Joly is an artificial lake in France, constructed before the 1970s.

Located  from the Belgian border, and close to Willies in the Nord département,  asl on the course of the Helpe Majeure, a tributary of the Sambre.

It was created with a dam to help regulate the flow of the Helpe Majeure, and also as a hydropower source, and as a source of water to cool the old thermal power station, Pont-sur-Sambre.

The lake has many species of fauna (some introduced by humans), and is currently classified as a Special Area of Conservation.

See also

References

Lakes of the Ardennes (France)
Lakes of Hauts-de-France
Lac du Val-Joly
Hauts-de-France region articles needing translation from French Wikipedia